This is a list of Dutch television related events from 2000.

Events
3 March - Michelle is selected to represent Netherlands at the 2001 Eurovision Song Contest with her song "Out On My Own". She is selected to be the forty-third Dutch Eurovision entry during Nationaal Songfestival held at Ahoy in Rotterdam.
2 September - Arno Woesthoff wins ƒ10 million in a game show Miljoenenjacht (Hunt for Millions). It was the only time in this game show the bonus round was a quiz-based instead of a luck-based round (which would later be internationally known as Deal or No Deal) first adopted in the following year; at about €4,537,801.68 or US$5.5 million, he also became the biggest winner in any game shows worldwide till this day, and also the biggest primetime game show winnings record in general.
30 December - Sandy Boots wins series 3 of Big Brother. This was the first series to be broadcast on Yorin.
Unknown - Mary Amora, performing as Tina Turner, wins the seventeenth series of Soundmixshow.

Debuts

Television shows

1950s
NOS Journaal (1956–present)

1970s
Sesamstraat (1976–present)

1980s
Jeugdjournaal (1981–present)
Soundmixshow (1985-2002)
Het Klokhuis (1988–present)

1990s
Goede tijden, slechte tijden (1990–present)
Monte Carlo (1998-2002)
Big Brother (1999-2006)
De Club van Sinterklaas (1999-2009)

Ending this year
Goudkust (1996-2001)

Births

Deaths

See also
2001 in the Netherlands